The eXile: Sex, Drugs, and Libel in the New Russia is a 2000 memoir by Mark Ames and Matt Taibbi, published by Grove Press. Edward Limonov wrote the foreword.

It includes selected articles from the newspaper The eXile, including ones by the editors, from the publication's first year of operation, as well as correspondence involving the publication. It was initially slated for a circa 1998 release, but legal issues meant that the publisher's lawyers delayed the publication.

Release and reception

The authors, within the United States, hosted a book tour.

Publishers Weekly stated that it is "tasteless", reflecting the source material, but that the book and source material "incisively probe contemporary Russian reality--and the expatriate mindset." Owen Matthews of The Moscow Times criticized the book in particular, rather than the derivative publication, because of a lack of focus on the shocking material and too much focus on mundane management issues. Natalia Antonova, of the same publication, stated that she believed the book "gleefully detailed sexual assault and abuse", reflected "nihilism", and fueled "misogynist caricatures".

On October 25, 2017, National Public Radio (NPR) journalist Robin Young, while attending an event with Taibbi at the Harvard Book Store in Cambridge, Massachusetts, made an inquiry over some sections of the book allegedly describing behavior that is demeaning or sexual harassment towards women. The book was marked as "non-fiction" on the copyright page. However both Ames and Taibbi have said that it's satirical, and Grove Press, the publisher, put out a statement that "the statement on the copyright page is incorrect. This book combines exaggerated, invented satire and nonfiction reporting and was categorized as nonfiction because there is no category for a book that is both". Regarding the alleged sexual harassment described in the book, both Ames and Taibbi have denied it happened. The employees in question were interviewed by Paste magazine, and they stated that the events described are "silly" and "never happenned".  As a result of the controversy, Taibbi wrote several apologetic posts on Facebook and canceled some speaking engagements he had.

References

External links
 The Exile - Grove Atlantic

2000 non-fiction books
Books about post-Soviet Russia
Books by Matt Taibbi
Grove Press books
Collaborative non-fiction books